Greatest Hits 3 is the third compilation album by American country music singer Tim McGraw. The album was released on October 7, 2008.

The official announcement of the album was made on August 28, 2008, on McGraw's official website.

No new material was recorded for Greatest Hits 3. However, the album does include two songs not previously released on any of McGraw's albums: "Find Out Who Your Friends Are" (a number one collaboration with Tracy Lawrence and Kenny Chesney, also featured on Lawrence's 2007 album For the Love) and "Nine Lives", a collaboration with Def Leppard. The album also features a live version of "Real Good Man" (2003).

On October 14, 2008, McGraw issued a statement regarding his disappointment with his record label's decision to release the compilation instead of a new studio record. McGraw stated: "It has to be just as confusing to the fans as it is to me. I had no involvement in the creation or presentation of this record." He went on to say: "In the spirit of an election year, I would simply say to my fans, I'm Tim McGraw, and I don't approve their message."

Track listing

Charts

Weekly charts

Year-end charts

Certifications

References

Tim McGraw albums
2008 greatest hits albums
Curb Records compilation albums
Albums produced by Tim McGraw
Albums produced by Byron Gallimore
Unauthorized albums